Shamsurin Abdul Rahman (born 7 July 1967) is a former Malaysian footballer.

Career
Shamsurin started his career at Malacca FA, but is more known is his 7-year stint as a Sarawak FA player, whom coach Alan Vest brought together with Mazelan Wahid and Ong Kim Swee from Malacca FA in 1993. As a striker, he was partnered with players such as John Hunter, Affendi Julaihi and Alistair Edwards during his stay at Sarawak.

Shamsurin also played for Malaysia national football team, and was in the squad for the inaugural 1996 Tiger Cup tournament, where Malaysia finished as runner-up in the final against Thailand national football team. Shamsurin scored 4 goals in the tournament.

After retiring as professional player, Shamsurin moved into coaching. He coached Sarawak FA's Malaysia President Cup (under-21) squad from 2011.

References

External links
 Legendary Shamsurin Abdul Rahman
 Shamsurin tuntut pampasan
 Bujang Senang-Players Profile
 Juniors taking heart from Crocs big win

Malaysian footballers
Malaysia international footballers
Sarawak FA players
Malacca FA players
Living people
1967 births
People from Malacca
Association football forwards